Marius Meisfjord Jøsevold (born 11 January 1975) is a Norwegian politician for the Socialist Left Party.

He served as a deputy representative to the Parliament of Norway from Nordland during the terms 2009–2013 and 2017–2021.

References

1975 births
Living people
People from Nesna
Deputy members of the Storting
Socialist Left Party (Norway) politicians
Nordland politicians